Spacecom is a satellite communications company.

Spacecom may also refer to:
Space.com, a space technology website
Space Command (disambiguation)
United States Space Command